Daria Nikolaevna Malygina (born 4 April 1994, in Abaza) is a Russian volleyball player. She was part of the Russia women's national volleyball team at the 2016 FIVB Volleyball World Grand Prix in Thailand and the 2016 Summer Olympics in Rio de Janeiro.

At club level, she played for Dinamo Kazan before moving to Zarechie Odintsovo in November 2015.

Clubs
  Dinamo Kazan-2 (2011–2013)
  Dinamo Kazan (2013–2015)
  Zarechie Odintsovo (2015–2017)
  Dinamo Kazan (2017–2018)

Awards

Clubs
 2014–15 Russian Championship –  Gold medal (with Dinamo Kazan)

References

External links
 
 Profile  at VC Zarechie Odintsovo (Volleyball Centre Moscow Oblast)
 Profile at Volleyball club Dinamo-Kazan
 
 

1994 births
Living people
People from Abaza (town)
Russian women's volleyball players
Sportspeople from Khakassia
Olympic volleyball players of Russia
Volleyball players at the 2016 Summer Olympics